John McDonald (born 9 April 1960) in Banbridge, Co Down is a former Irish rugby union international player who played for the Irish national rugby union team. He played as a hooker.
He played for the Ireland team from 1987 to 1990, winning 4 caps and was a member of the Ireland squad at 1987 Rugby World Cup. He made his debut in May 1987 against Canada in a 46-19 win.

References

External links
ESPN Profile

1960 births
Living people
Irish rugby union players
Ireland international rugby union players
Ulster Rugby players
Rugby union players from County Down
Rugby union hookers